The Past is Another Country may refer to:

The Past is Another Country, a 2004 album by Cadaverous Condition
The Past is Another Country: Rhodesia 1890–1979, a 1979 book by Martin Meredith

See also
The Past is a Foreign Country (disambiguation)
Another Country (disambiguation)